Obernau is a village and a former municipality in the district of Altenkirchen, in Rhineland-Palatinate, in western Germany. Since January 2021, it is part of the municipality Neitersen.

References

Altenkirchen (district)
Former municipalities in Rhineland-Palatinate